Ashby St Mary, historically Ascebei, is a small village and civil parish in the English county of Norfolk. For the purposes of local government, the parish falls within the district of South Norfolk.

The village contains a number of heritage-listed buildings, which include a 13th-century church, a War Memorial, and an early 18th Century Hall, Barn and Garden house.

Location

The church has a high tower, a long, low nave, and an impressive Norman doorway. A tombstone in the graveyard depicts a husband and wife (George and Ann Basey) feeding their turkeys and geese; Ann's carving is repeated on the village sign, which was commissioned in 2000 to celebrate the millennium. It also depicts a windmill which stood in the village until at least 1916.

Geography
Ashby's topography is, like most of East Anglia, made up of river meadows and flat agricultural landscape. The geology mostly consists of Cainozoic Sedimentary rock, with a layer of boulder clay and sand laid down in the last ice age. Ashby St Mary has slightly acidic loamy and clayey soils with impeded drainage, and low carbon. The cropping of Ashby is reasonably flexible but more suited to autumn sown crops and grassland.

Climate
Ashby has a temperate maritime climate, the majority of the British Isles, with relatively cool summers and mild winters due to being east of the Pennines. There is regular, light precipitation throughout the year.

History

Ashby St Mary, originally called Ascebei has existed for roughly a millennium, as it was recorded in the Domesday Book  as;

 "Ascebei / As(s)ebei:
Roger Bigot; Godric the steward." 

The village of Ashby St Mary has existed since the late Saxon era, however, compared to other nearby areas, there was not much activity in the area beforehand, however there is a Bronze Age ringditch, and a Neolithic arrowhead. Thomas de Cottingham, a royal clerk who later became Master of the Rolls in Ireland was appointed rector of Ashby in  1349: he was notorious for pluralism. Ashby Lodge was built in 1788 for the Surgeon General of the East India Company, with a lined facade. Ashby Hall is an early 18th century Country house, but originally there was an older, more elaborate house on the site, there is also a late 17th century Garden house situated nearby, they are now separate private residences. The village used to be situated in the Loddon Hundred.

St. Mary's Church
Lending its name to the village, St Mary's church was first built sometime before 1186, in the late Anglo-Saxon era, however, only the foundations of the original church still exists. The nave of the church is Norman, and still retains the typical long low features of a Norman church, the tower is 15th Century, but with later crenellations at the top. The chancel is post 13th century, and the south porch is 16th century, however most of the internal dressings date from the 17th century. Situated in the north of Ashby St Mary, St Mary's church is notable for its Norman doorway, thought to have been carved by the same master mason as both Mundham's St. Peter, and Heckingham's St. Gregory.

The Rectors of St. Mary's date back to the late 13th century, starting with Henry de Lenn in 12--, all the way to Christopher Ellis in 2015. The east-facing window at the head of the chancel has many stained glass elements, and one of the south chancel windows is one of many recreations of The Light of the World used in many East Anglian Churches. Other parts of the church include; the organ, which is medium-sized and was overhauled in 1962, and the Ten Commandments, located at the head of the chancel, are based on the Institutes of the Christian Religion (1536) by John Calvin.

The Church was used in October 2010 by Music composer Jamie Robertson who along with the Poringland Singers Choir recorded an incidental soundtrack to the Big Finish Productions story Doctor Who Relative Dimensions (with Paul McGann, Jake McGann, Carole Ann Ford and Niky Wardley).

Ashby St Mary Mill
Ashby St Mary post mill was built c.1758 and remained working for over 150 years. Located on Ashby Common, the mill had a roundhouse and had a 75 foot diameter footprint. The buck had a gallery at the eaves, a balcony porch with a gable end roof. The mill house was sunk one floor below ground level in order to not block wind from the mill. An auxiliary steam engine had been installed by 1900. It continued running up until at least 1906. The mill is first shown on the 1797 Faden's map, and also appears again on both the Bryants map in 1826, and the Greenwoods map in 1834.

The War Memorial
The war memorial for Ashby St. Mary is located in St Mary's Churchyard, it holds the following names for the First World War:

 Company Sergeant-Major William E. Starman MM (d.1918), 1st Battalion, Royal Norfolk Regiment
 Private Ernest W. Bush (1888-1917), 9th Battalion, Royal Norfolk Regiment
 Able-Seaman Herbert V. Chambers (1897-1917), Drake Battalion, Royal Naval Division

And, the following name for the Second World War:

 Private John S. Cotton (1911-1940), 1st Battalion, Royal Norfolk Regiment

Listed Buildings
Within Ashby St Mary, there are five listed buildings, all of which are Grade II listed.

Demographics

Public services
Policing in Ashby St Mary is provided by Norfolk Constabulary, Statutory emergency fire and rescue service is provided by the Norfolk Fire and Rescue Service, of which the nearest station is in Loddon. The nearest NHS hospital is Norfolk and Norwich University Hospital in Norwich, Ambulance services are provided by East of England Ambulance Service.

Waste management is co-ordinated by South Norfolk Council. Locally produced inert waste for disposal is processed into fuel for use in combined heat and power facilities in Europe. Ashby St Mary's distribution network operator for electricity is UK Power Networks. Drinking water and waste water are managed by Anglian Water.

References

External links

Information from Genuki Norfolk on Ashby St Mary.
Ashby St Mary Parish Council Website The Official Website of Ashby St Mary Parish Council
Ashby St Mary church
Ashby windmill

Villages in Norfolk
South Norfolk
Civil parishes in Norfolk